"Big Ideas" is a song by LCD Soundsystem, released as a single on August 11, 2008.  It was originally written for the film 21 and appears on its soundtrack album.

This song was ranked number 63 on Rolling Stones list of the 100 Best Singles of 2008.

Track listing

References

LCD Soundsystem songs
2008 singles
Songs written by James Murphy (electronic musician)
2008 songs